The Lewistown Federal Building & Post Office, also known as the Lewistown Main Post Office, is located at 204 Third Ave. N. in Lewistown in Fergus County, Montana.  It was built in 1931.  It was listed on the National Register of Historic Places in 1986 as U.S. Post Office and Federal Building – Lewistown.

Its design is credited to James A. Wetmore.  It was built by the McGough Bros. firm of Illinois.

It is Beaux Arts or Late Beaux Arts in style.

The building was dedicated in a ceremony attended by almost 1,000 persons, on November 25, 1931.

References

Federal buildings in the United States
Post office buildings on the National Register of Historic Places in Montana
Beaux-Arts architecture in Montana
Government buildings completed in 1931
National Register of Historic Places in Fergus County, Montana
1931 establishments in Montana